This is a list of female professional bodybuilders. All people listed here have an IFBB pro card.

A 
 Jennifer Abshire  
 Heather Armbrust  
 Lisa Aukland  
 Rachita Reddy Agumamidi
 Rachana Reddy Agumamidi

B
 Fannie Barrios
 Christa Bauch
 Kay Baxter
 Shelley Beattie
 Stacey Bentley
 Juliette Bergmann

 Laura Binetti
 Andrulla Blanchette
 Sheila Bleck
 Fabiola Boulanger
 Th-resa Bostick
 Debbie Bramwell-Washington
 Brigita Brezovac
 Sharon Bruneau

C

 Dayana Cadeau    
 Candice Carr-Archer  
 Tina Chandler  
 Valentina Chepiga
 Kim Chizevsky-Nicholls
 Melissa Coates
 Tazzie Colomb
 Laura Combes
 Lynn Conkwright
 Laura Creavalle
 Lisa Cross
 Candy Csencsits

D
 Laura Davies  
 Angela Debatin  
 Johanna Dejager  
 Diana Dennis  
 Carla Dunlap  
 Sarah Dunlap

E
 Ritva Eloma  
 Christine Envall  
 Corinna Everson  
 Kellie Everts

F
 Heather Foster 
 Bev Francis  
 Anne Freitas  
 Jacqueline Fuchs  
 Nicole Fuchs
 Georgia Fudge  

 Nikki Fuller  
 Aneta Florczyk

G
 Sue Gafner
 Ondrea Gates
 Erika Geisen
 Colette Guimond

H
 Jitka Harazimova
 Kristy Hawkins
 Raye Hollitt
 Yolanda Hughes-Heying

J
 Negrita Jayde

 Michelle Jin
 Monique Jones

K
 Ericca Kern
 Tonya Knight
 Marianna Komlos

 Iris Kyle
 Natalia Kuznetsova

L
 Anja Langer
 Debi Laszewski
 Cathy LeFrançois
 Marja Lehtonen
 Gladys Lewis
 Cammie Lusko
 Lisa Lyon

M
 Marie Mahabir
 Ellen van Maris
 Nita Marquez
 Margaret Martin
 Sharon Marvel
 Denise Masino
 Rachel McLish
 Gayle Moher
 Geraldine Morgan
 Debbie Muggli
 Lenda Murray

N
 Colette Nelson
 Susanne Niederhauser

O
 Dona Oliveira
 Yaxeni Oriquen-Garcia
 Lora Ottenad
 Kortney Olson

P
 Jackie Paisley
 Cathey Palyo

 Betty Pariso
 Debbie Patton
 Francesca Petitjean
 Cindy Phillips

 Alina Popa
 Gladys Portugues
 Sue Price

Q
 Rhonda Lee Quaresma

R
 Brenda Raganot
 Charlene Rink
 Annie Rivieccio
 Mary Roberts
 Denise Rutkowski
 Dawn Romenesko

S
 Angela Salvagno
 Peggy Schoolcraft
 Anja Schreiner
 Charla Sedacca
 Kathy Segal
 Elena Seiple
 Andrea Shaw
 Nicola Shaw
 Alana Shipp
 Elena Shportun-Willemer
 Kacey Stefan
 Carolynne Sullivan

T
 Erin Thomson
 Helle Trevino
 Roberta Tuor

V
 Betty Viana-Adkins
 Julia Vins

W
 Rasa von Werder
 Dena Westerfield
 Claudia Wilbourn
 Christi Wolf
 Nancy Oshana Wehbe

Y

 Aleesha Young

See also
 List of British bodybuilders
 List of German bodybuilders
 List of female fitness & figure competitors

Lists of female bodybuilders
Professional bodybuilding

Incomplete sports lists